The 85th Battalion (Nova Scotia Highlanders), CEF, was an infantry battalion of the Canadian Expeditionary Force during the Great War. The 85th Battalion was authorized on 14 September 1915 and embarked for Great Britain on 12 October 1916. Disembarking in France in February 1917, it fought as part of the 12th Infantry Brigade, 4th Canadian Division in France and Flanders until the end of the war. The battalion is most famous for capturing Hill 145 in their first battle. Today, the Vimy Memorial stands on Hill 145.

History 
The 85th Battalion was raised in Halifax on 14 September 1915 and it recruited throughout Nova Scotia. The battalion embarked for Great Britain on 12 October 1916, and landed in France on 10 February 1917.

Before the attack on Vimy Ridge the battalion had been used as a labour battalion and had not seen combat.  They were the last remaining reserve battalion in the 12th Brigade when all of the ridge had been taken except for the highpoint Hill 145.  Since this hill overlooked all of the newly taken Canadian positions it could not remain in German hands.  At 6PM the 85th launched an attack unsupported by artillery due to the closeness of the hill to the Canadians.  Ten minutes later the battalion had taken the hill in a ferocious bayonet charge at the cost of 56 dead and almost 300 wounded, many of whom later died.

In May 1919 the city of Edinburgh hosted the battalion with a parade and special dinner. It was intended that the 85th would then tour Scotland but the high command informed them that their boat was ready to take them home. On May 31, 1919, the battalion departed from Liverpool, England, aboard SS Adriatic on its journey home to Canada. A total of 49 officers and 1,800 "other ranks" (including attached NB & PEI soldiers from other units) were on board. They arrived in Halifax on June 7, 1919.

The battalion disbanded on 15 September 1920.

Perpetuation 
The perpetuation of the 85th battalion was assigned in 1920 to 1st Battalion (85th Battalion, CEF), the Cape Breton Highlanders, with the king's and regimental colours of the battalion laid up in Government House in Halifax. The King's and Regimental Colours are on permanent display in the foyer of Government House, Nova Scotia.

Commanding officers
The 85th Battalion had six Officers Commanding:
LCol A.H. Borden, 12 October 1916 – 6 July 1917
Maj J.L. Ralston, DSO, 31 July 1917 – 11 September 1917
LCol A.H. Borden, 11 September 1917 – 26 April 1918
LCol J.L. Ralston, CMG, DSO, 26 April 1918 – 23 October 1918
Maj J.M. Miller, DSO, MC, 23 October 1918 – 19 November 1918
LCol J.L. Ralston, CMG, DSO, 19 November 1918-Demobilization

Battle honours
The 85th Battalion was awarded the following battle honours:

War poetry
In 1924, a poetic tribute to the 85th Battalion was composed in Canadian Gaelic by Alasdair MacÌosaig  of St. Andrew's Channel, Cape Breton, Nova Scotia. The poem praised the courage of the fallen and told them that they had fought better against the Germans than the English did, while also lamenting the absence of the Battalion's fallen soldiers from their families and villages. The poem was first published in the Antigonish-based newspaper The Casket on February 14, 1924.

Notable people
 William Gordon Ernst
 Isaac Phills

See also 

 List of infantry battalions in the Canadian Expeditionary Force

Bibliography
Notes

References

 - Total pages: 414
Brian Douglas Tennyson, Nova Scotia at War 1914-1919. Halifax: Nimbus, 2017.

Works cited

External links

CEF Study Group

Battalions of the Canadian Expeditionary Force